Neustadt – Speyer is an electoral constituency (German: Wahlkreis) represented in the Bundestag. It elects one member via first-past-the-post voting. Under the current constituency numbering system, it is designated as constituency 208. It is located in southeastern Rhineland-Palatinate, comprising the cities of Neustadt an der Weinstraße and Speyer, the district of Bad Dürkheim, and the southern part of the Rhein-Pfalz-Kreis district.

Neustadt – Speyer was created for the 1965 federal election. Since 2017, it has been represented by Johannes Steiniger of the Christian Democratic Union (CDU).

Geography
Neustadt – Speyer is located in southeastern Rhineland-Palatinate. As of the 2021 federal election, it comprises the independent cities of Neustadt an der Weinstraße and Speyer, the district of Bad Dürkheim, and the municipalities of Schifferstadt, Otterstadt, and Waldsee and the Verbandsgemeinde of Römerberg-Dudenhofen from the Rhein-Pfalz-Kreis district.

History
Neustadt – Speyer was created in 1965. In the 1965 through 1976 elections, it was constituency 160 in the numbering system. In the 1980 through 1998 elections, it was number 158. In the 2002 election, it was number 211. In the 2005 election, it was number 210. In the 2009 and 2013 elections, it was number 209. Since the 2017 election, it has been number 208.

Originally, the constituency comprised the cities of Neustadt an der Weinstraße and Speyer and the districts of Landkreis Neustadt an der Weinstraße and Landkreis Speyer. In the 1972 through 1998 elections, it comprised the cities of Neustadt an der Weinstraße and Speyer, the municipalities of Bad Dürkheim and Haßloch and the Verbandsgemeinden of Deidesheim, Freinsheim, Lambrecht (Pfalz), and Wachenheim from the Bad Dürkheim district, and the municipalities of Römerberg and Schifferstadt and the Verbandsgemeinden of Dudenhofen and Rheinauen from the Landkreis Ludwigshafen district. It acquired its current borders in the 2002 election.

Members
The constituency has been held by the Christian Democratic Union (CDU) during all but one Bundestag term since its creation. It was first represented by Bernhard Vogel from 1965 to 1969, followed by Georg Gölter until 1972. Peter Büchner of the Social Democratic Party (SPD) was elected in 1972 and served a single term. Former member Gölter regained the constituency in 1976. He was succeeded by Theo Magin in 1980, who served until 1994. Norbert Schindler was representative from 1994 to 2017. Johannes Steiniger was elected in 2017 and re-elected in 2021.

Election results

2021 election

2017 election

2013 election

2009 election

Notes

References

Federal electoral districts in Rhineland-Palatinate
1965 establishments in West Germany
Constituencies established in 1965
Neustadt an der Weinstraße
Speyer
Bad Dürkheim (district)
Rhein-Pfalz-Kreis